Qu Yun (born June 5, 1978 in Hangzhou, Zhejiang) is a former butterfly stroke swimmer from China. In 1993, she broke the Asian Record in women's 200m butterfly at 2:08.53 in the Chinese National Games, which ranked number 1 in the world in 1993. She also won silver in the 100 m butterfly at 59.27, which ranked number 2 in the world. She competed in 1994 World Aquatics Championships and won silver medals in women's 100 m (59.69) and 200 m butterfly (2:07.40). She finished behind her compatriot, Liu Limin, in both races. The time in 200 m butterfly was her career best. In October, 1994, she set career best in women's 100 m butterfly (58.70) in Asian Games to win silver medal behind Liu Limin. In 1996, she won the Olympic trial in April with a time of 2:09.66 in 200 m butterfly over Liu Limin, and she competed in women's 200 m butterfly at the 1996 Summer Olympics and placed 4th. In 1997, Qu made a comeback and scored a double win (100 butterfly in 59.36 and 200 m butterfly in 2:08.10) in Chinese national Games.  Her time in the 200 m butterfly ranked number 2 in the world behind Susan O'Neill.  In January, 1998, she competed in the women's 200 m butterfly in 1998 World Aquatics Championships and finished 5th (2:10.49). This was her last appearance in major competition. She retired after the 2001 Chinese National Games.

She obtained her bachelor's degree (human development) and master's degree (sport psychology) at Binghamton University and became an assistant coach in Iowa State University. She then returned to Binghamton University as the associate head coach. She currently is an assistant at Georgia Tech.

External links
 Info Page on Iowa State University Cyclone Swimming (retrieved September 2nd, 2007)
 Coaching Staff Page Binghamton Bearcats Website (retrieved September 3, 2011)
 (retrieved January 29, 2014)

1978 births
Living people
Chinese female butterfly swimmers
Swimmers from Zhejiang
Binghamton University alumni
Olympic swimmers of China
Sportspeople from Hangzhou
Swimmers at the 1996 Summer Olympics
World Aquatics Championships medalists in swimming
Asian Games medalists in swimming
Asian Games silver medalists for China
Swimmers at the 1994 Asian Games
Medalists at the 1994 Asian Games
Binghamton Bearcats athletes
20th-century Chinese women